Bogdan Andrei Bernevig (born 1978 in Bucharest) is a Romanian Quantum Condensed Matter Professor of Physics at Princeton University and the recipient of the John Simon Guggenheim Fellowship in 2017.

Biography 
Andrei Bernevig took part in the Physics Olympiad in Bucharest from 1994 to 1997 as a teenager (and won international gold and silver medals). He graduated from Stanford University (bachelor's degree in physics and master's degree in mathematics in 2001) and received his PhD from Stanford University under Shoucheng Zhang. As a postdoctoral fellow he came to the Center for Theoretical Physics at Princeton University, where he was appointed Assistant Professor in 2009 and Associate Professor in 2014.

He deals with the application of topology in solid state physics, for example in the fractional quantum hall effect, and novel topological materials (topological insulators, topological superconductors) and spin transport or spintronics. He also deals with ferrous high-temperature superconductors and predicted s-wave pairing there.

Awards 
In 2016 he received the New Horizons in Physics Prize. In 2014 he received the Sackler Prize. In 2017 he was awarded a Guggenheim Fellowship and, in 2018, an Alexander von Humboldt Professorship. In 2019 he was awarded the James C. McGroddy Prize for New Materials from the American Physical Society. He was named a Fellow of the American Physical Society in 2022 "for broad and significant contributions to the discovery and understanding of new topological quantum phases".

Selected publications 
Source:

 
 
 
 
 B. A. Bernevig and S.-C. Zhang, Quantum Spin Hall Effect Phys. Rev. Lett. 96, 106802 (2006)

References

External links 

Romanian physicists
Scientists from Bucharest
Romanian emigrants to the United States
1978 births
Living people
Fellows of the American Physical Society